Cutato is a small town in Cuchi municipality, Cuando Cubango Province, Angola. It lies on the eastern bank of the Cutato River.

References

Populated places in Cuando Cubango Province